The Academy of Foreign Intelligence (alternatively known as the SVR Academy, previously known as the Yuri  Andropov Red Banner Institute and the Red Banner Institute) is one of the primary espionage academies of Russia, and previously the Soviet Union, serving the KGB and its successor organization, the Foreign Intelligence Service. It was attended by future President Vladimir Putin during the 1980s.

Location
The school is located near Moscow, with a main facility north of Chelebityevo and a secondary facility at Yurlovo.

History
An earlier iteration of the school was founded in 1938 and first called the Special Purpose School (Shkola osovogo naznacheniya, SHON) under NKVD. It was renamed the Higher Intelligence School (VRSh) from 1948-1968. It was alternatively known as School 1010 or the 101st School, and referred to as K1 or Gridnevka by students.

Following the dissolution of the Soviet Union, student enrollment dropped from approximately 300 to around 50.

Foreign students
The Institute trained Libyan intelligence officers for Muammar Gaddafi.

Notable alumni

 Sergei Ivanov
 Vladimir Putin
 Yuri Shvets

Notable staff

 Oleg Nechiporenko (1985 - 1991)
 Anatoli Yatskov

See also
FSB Academy
Sparrow School
Yuri Andropov

References

External link

Intelligence education
KGB
Espionage in the Soviet Union